Peter Clarke may refer to:

Peter B. Clarke (1940–2011), British religious scholar
Peter J. Clarke, U.S. Navy admiral, see Joint Task Force Guantanamo
Peter Clarke (admiral) (born 1951), Australian admiral
Peter Clarke (artist) (1929–2014), South African artist
Peter Clarke (cartoonist) (1935–2012), British cartoonist for The Guardian
Peter Clarke (chess player) (1933–2014), British chess player and writer
Peter Clarke (cricketer) (1881–1915), Irish cricketer
Peter Clarke (drummer) (born 1957), a.k.a. Budgie, drummer for Siouxsie and the Banshees and The Creatures
Peter Clarke (footballer) (born 1982), footballer with Tranmere Rovers F.C.
Peter Clarke (historian) (born 1942), English historian
Peter Clarke (police officer) (born 1955), retired senior police officer; former head of the Counter Terrorist Command
Peter Clarke (social worker) (1948–2007), child welfare activist in Wales
Peter Metro (born Peter Clarke, c. 1960), Jamaican reggae deejay
Peter Clarke (tennis) (born 1979), Irish tennis player
Peter Clarke (rugby league) (born 1974), Australian rugby league footballer

See also
Peter Clark (disambiguation)
Peter Russell-Clarke (born 1935), Australian television personality and author